Gray Gables station is a former train station in Bourne, Massachusetts.

History

The station was first built by the Old Colony Railroad as a stop for President Grover Cleveland's nearby summer home of Gray Gables. It was located on the Monument Neck Road in Bourne. The station was moved to the site of the Aptucxet Trading Post Museum in Bourne in 1977, and was renovated and moved closer to Aptuxet Road in 2013.

References

External links

 Gray Gables Railroad Station—Bourne Historical Society

Bourne, Massachusetts
Old Colony Railroad Stations on Cape Cod
Former railway stations in Massachusetts